The John M. Ware Sr. House, also known as the Ware House, near Corinth in Heard County, Georgia, was listed on the National Register of Historic Places in 1980.

The listing address was restricted.

This clapboard house was built in 1838 and burned in the spring of 1983.

Ware family papers are archived.

References

Houses on the National Register of Historic Places in Georgia (U.S. state)
National Register of Historic Places in Heard County, Georgia
Houses completed in 1838